This is a list of Italian television related events from 2003.

Events
8 May - Floriana Secondi wins season 3 of Grande Fratello.

Debuts

Rai

Serials 

 Corto Maltese – cartoon from the Hugo Pratt’s comic; coproduction with France.

International
19 March -  Scrubs (MTV) (2001–2010)
October - // The Adventures of Paddington Bear (Italia 1) (1997–2000)

Television shows

RAI

Miniseries 

 The best of youth – by Marco Tullio Giordana, with Luigi Lo Cascio, Alessio Boni, Jasmine Trinca, Adriana Asti; 4 episodes. It's a family saga telling the Italian history from the Sixties to 2000, through the lives of two brothers (a policeman and a progressive intellectual); distributed also in a theatrical version, with international success.

Mediaset
Grande Fratello (2000–present)

Ending this year

Births

Deaths

See also
2003 in Italy
List of Italian films of 2003

References